Derek Armstrong (born April 23, 1973) is a Canadian professional ice hockey coach and former player. Armstrong played in the National Hockey League, where he played for the New York Islanders, Ottawa Senators, New York Rangers, Los Angeles Kings and  the St. Louis Blues.

Playing career
Derek Armstrong spent the majority of his NHL career with the Los Angeles Kings. After being taken by the New York Islanders in the 6th round, 128th overall of the 1992 NHL Entry Draft, Armstrong finally played his first full NHL campaign in the 2002–03 season, after having spent eight years in the minor leagues. Most of his non-NHL stints were in the two "AAA" North American development leagues: American Hockey League and International Hockey League.

Due to the NHL lockout, as some NHL players did, Armstrong went to Europe, to play hockey in the Swiss National League A, for SC Rapperswil-Jona, totaling 17 points in only 12 games. Statistically, his best season was the 2006–07 campaign when he had 44 points as seventh place in Kings' points that year.

Armstrong signed with the St. Louis Blues on September 8, 2009, where he finished his final pro season playing for his former LA King coach, Andy Murray.

Coaching career
On April 11, 2012, Armstrong was named head coach of the Denver Cutthroats of the Central Hockey League.  Despite his NHL career, he is best known in Denver for being part of the Denver Grizzlies' 1994-95 Turner Cup championship in the team's only season in Denver (though they would later move to Salt Lake City and become the Utah Grizzlies, the team's success is widely credited for attracting the Quebec Nordiques to Denver that following offseason, where they would become the Colorado Avalanche).  After two seasons with the Denver Cutthroats as head coach, Armstrong was then appointed as team president.

Career statistics

Awards and honours

References

External links
 

1973 births
Canadian ice hockey centres
Canadian ice hockey coaches
Central Hockey League coaches
Denver Grizzlies players
Detroit Vipers players
Hartford Wolf Pack players
Ice hockey people from Ottawa
Living people
Los Angeles Kings players
Manchester Monarchs (AHL) players
New York Islanders draft picks
New York Islanders players
New York Rangers players
Ottawa Senators players
Peoria Rivermen (AHL) players
SC Rapperswil-Jona Lakers players
St. Louis Blues players
Salt Lake Golden Eagles (IHL) players
SC Bern players
Sudbury Wolves players
Utah Grizzlies (IHL) players
Worcester IceCats players
Canadian expatriate ice hockey players in Switzerland
Canadian expatriate ice hockey players in the United States